This is a list is of local medium wave radio broadcast stations, by date of establishment in Western Australia, as they developed from the 1920s to the 1940s.

6WF, 1924 

Established by Wesfarmers in 1924, 6WF was eventually taken over by the national broadcaster, the Australian Broadcasting Commission, in 1932.

6ML, 1930 
6ML was established in 1930.

6KG, 1931 
6KG in Kalgoorlie was established in 1931.

6PR, 1931 
6PR was established in 1931.

6IX, 1933 
6iX was established in 1933.

6PM, 1936 
6PM was established in 1936.

6GE Geraldton was established in 1937

6WN, 1938 

6WN was established in 1938 as the second Perth station in the Australian Broadcasting Commission radio network.

6KY, 1941 
6KY opened in 1941.

Networks 

At various stages in the radio stations' histories they were linked to broadcasting networks, and operated by broadcasting companies.

Typically in the 1960s 6PR was linked to two other stations, 6TZ and 6CI.

Broadcasting companies and organisations 
 Australian Broadcasting Corporation
 Nicholsons Broadcasters
 West Australian Broadcasters
 Whitfords Broadcasting Network

See also
History of broadcasting in Australia
List of Australian AM radio stations
List of radio station callsigns in Western Australia

Notes

References 

 Leigh Edmonds and Brian Shoesmith 'Radio' in 

Western